Que Bom Te Ver Viva (English: How Nice to See You Alive) is a 1989 Brazilian docudrama directed by Lúcia Murat, which portrays the situation of torture experienced during the military dictatorship in Brazil.

Synopsis 
Lúcia Murat, who was tortured during the military dictatorship, chronicles the lives of some Brazilian women who took up arms against the military regime. There are a number of guerrilla testimonies and daily scenes from these women who have recovered, each in their own way, the various meanings of life.

Awards 
1989: Festival de Brasília
Best Film (won)
Best Actress (Irene Ravache) (won)
Best Cinematography (Walter Carvalho) (won)

1990: Festival do Rio
Special Jury Award (won)

References

External links 
 

1989 films
1980s Portuguese-language films
Brazilian drama films
Films about Brazilian military dictatorship
1989 drama films